David Gordon Brown (born 1939) was a Canadian international lawn bowler.

Bowls career
Brown was born in Coventry, England and emigrated to Canada before winning a bronze medal in the fours at the 1992 World Outdoor Bowls Championship in Worthing. 

He also won a silver medal in the fours at the 1986 Commonwealth Games in Edinburgh.

He won two medals at the 1991 Asia Pacific Bowls Championships, including a gold in the fours with Ronnie Jones, Dave Houtby and Bill Boettger, in Kowloon, Hong Kong.

References

1939 births
2007 deaths
Canadian male bowls players
Commonwealth Games medallists in lawn bowls
Commonwealth Games silver medallists for Canada
Bowls players at the 1986 Commonwealth Games
Medallists at the 1986 Commonwealth Games